Lehfed (also known as Lihfid) is a municipality in the Byblos District of Keserwan-Jbeil Governorate, Lebanon. It is 55 kilometers north of Beirut. Lehfed has an average elevation of 1000 meters above sea level and a total land area of 529 hectares. There were three companies with more than five employees operating in the village as of 2008. Its inhabitants are predominantly Maronite Catholics.

References

Populated places in Byblos District
Maronite Christian communities in Lebanon